Hypostatic union (from the Greek:  hypóstasis, "person, subsistence") is a technical term in Christian theology employed in mainstream Christology to describe the union of Christ's humanity and divinity in one hypostasis, or individual personhood.

The most basic explanation for the hypostatic union is Jesus Christ being both fully God and fully man. He is both perfectly divine and perfectly human and has two complete and distinct natures at once.

The Athanasian Creed recognized this doctrine and affirmed its importance by stating, "He is God from the essence of the Father, begotten before time; and he is human from the essence of his mother, born in time; completely God, completely human, with a rational soul and human flesh; equal to the Father as regards divinity, less than the Father as regards humanity. Although he is God and human, yet Christ is not two, but one. He is one, however, not by his divinity being turned into flesh, but by God's taking humanity to himself. He is one, certainly not by the blending of his essence, but by the unity of his person. For just as one human is both rational soul and flesh, so too the one Christ is both God and human."

Hypostasis

The Greek term hypostasis (ὑπόστασις) had come into use as a technical term prior to the Christological debates of the late fourth and fifth centuries.  In pre-Christian times, Greek philosophy (primarily Stoicism) used the word. Some occurrences of the term hypostasis in the New Testament foreshadow the later, technical understanding of the word. Although it can translate literally as "substance", this has been a cause of some confusion; accordingly the New American Standard Bible translates it as "subsistence". Hypostasis denotes an actual, concrete existence, in contrast to abstract categories such as Platonic ideals.

In Kierkegaard's Philosophical Fragments, the dual nature of Christ is explored as a paradox, i.e. as "the ultimate paradox", because God, understood as a perfectly good, perfectly wise, perfectly powerful being, fully became a human, in the Christian understanding of the term: burdened by sin, limited in goodness, knowledge, and understanding. This paradox can only be resolved, Kierkegaard believed, by a leap of faith away from one's understanding and reason towards belief in God.

As the precise nature of this union is held to defy finite human comprehension, the hypostatic union is also referred to by the alternative term "mystical union".

Through history

Apollinaris of Laodicea was the first to use the term hypostasis in trying to understand the Incarnation.  Apollinaris described the union of the divine and human in Christ as being of a single nature and having a single essence — a single hypostasis.

Council of Ephesus
In the 5th century, a dispute arose between Cyril of Alexandria and Nestorius in which Nestorius claimed that the term theotokos could not be used to describe Mary, the mother of Christ. Nestorius argued for two distinct substances or hypostases, of divinity and humanity, in Christ. He maintained that divinity could not be born from a human because the divine nature is unoriginate. The Council of Ephesus in 431, under the leadership of Cyril himself as well as the Ephesian bishop Memnon, labeled Nestorius a neo-adoptionist, implying that the man Jesus is divine and the Son of God only by grace and not by nature, and deposed him as a heretic. In his letter to Nestorius, Cyril used the term "hypostatic" (Greek, καθ᾽ ὑπόστασιν kath' hypóstasin) to refer to Christ's divine and human natures being one, saying, “We must follow these words and teachings, keeping in mind what ‘having been made flesh’ means .... We say ... that the Word, by having united to himself hypostatically flesh animated by a rational soul, inexplicably and incomprehensibly became man.” Cyril also stressed on “μία φύσις τοῦ θεοῦ λόγου σεσαρκωμένη, meaning "one physis of the Word of God made flesh" (or "... of God the Word made flesh")”

Council of Chalcedon
The preeminent Antiochene theologian Theodore of Mopsuestia, contending against the monophysite heresy of Apollinarism, is believed to have taught that in Christ there are two natures (dyophysite), human and divine, and two corresponding hypostases (in the sense of "subject", "essence" but not "person") which co-existed. However, in Theodore's time the word hypostasis could be used in a sense synonymous with ousia (which clearly means "essence" rather than "person") as it had been used by Tatian and Origen. The Greek and Latin interpretations of Theodore's Christology have come under scrutiny since the recovery of his Catechetical Orations in the Syriac language.

In 451, the Ecumenical Council of Chalcedon promulgated the Chalcedonian Definition. It agreed with Theodore that there were two natures in the Incarnation.  However, the Council of Chalcedon also insisted that hypostasis be used as it was in the Trinitarian definition: to indicate the person (prosopon) and not the nature as with Apollinaris.

Oriental Orthodox rejection of Chalcedonian definition
The Oriental Orthodox Churches, having rejected the Chalcedonian Definition, were known as Miaphysites because they maintain the Cyrilian definition that characterized the incarnate Son as having one nature. The Chalcedonian "in two natures" formula (based, at least partially, on Colossians 2:9) was seen as derived from and akin to a Nestorian Christology. Contrariwise, the Chalcedonians saw the Oriental Orthodox as tending towards Eutychian Monophysitism. However, the Oriental Orthodox persistently specified that they have never believed in the doctrines of Eutyches, that they have always affirmed that Christ's humanity is consubstantial with our own, and they thus prefer the term Miaphysite to be referred to as a reference to Cyrillian Christology, which used the phrase "", "mía phýsis toû theoû lógou sesarkōménē". The term miaphysic means one united nature as opposed to one singular nature (monophysites). Thus the Miaphysite position maintains that although the nature of Christ is from two, it may only be referred to as one in its incarnate state because the natures always act in unity.

In recent times, leaders from the Eastern Orthodox and Oriental Orthodox churches have signed joint statements in an attempt to work towards reunification. Likewise the leaders of the Assyrian Church of the East, which venerates Nestorius and Theodore, have in recent times signed a joint agreement with leaders of the Roman Catholic Church acknowledging that their historical differences were over terminology rather than the actual intended meaning.

See also 

 Dyophysitism
 God-man (Christianity)
 Homoousion
 Person of Christ

References

Sources

External links 

Christology
Christian terminology
Catholic theology and doctrine
Eastern Orthodox theology
Nature of Jesus Christ